"Southern Man" is a song by Canadian-American singer-songwriter Neil Young, from his album After the Gold Rush, released in 1970. An extended live version can be heard on the Crosby Stills Nash & Young album 4 Way Street.

Description
The lyrics of "Southern Man" describe the racism towards blacks in the American South. In the song, Young tells the story of a white man (symbolically the entire white South) and how he mistreated his slaves. Young pleadingly asks when the South will make amends for the fortunes built through slavery when he sings:

I saw cotton and I saw black, 
tall white mansions and little shacks. 
Southern Man, when will you pay them back?

The song also mentions the practice of cross burning referencing the Ku Klux Klan.

Young was very sensitive about the song's message of anti-racism and anti-violence. During his 1973 tour, he canceled a show in Oakland, California because a fan was beaten and removed from the stage by a guard while the song was played.

Response
Southern rock band Lynyrd Skynyrd wrote their song "Sweet Home Alabama" in response to "Southern Man" and "Alabama" from Young's 1972 album Harvest. Young has said that he is a fan of both "Sweet Home Alabama" and Ronnie Van Zant, the lead vocalist for Lynyrd Skynyrd. "They play like they mean it," Young said in 1976. "I'm proud to have my name in a song like theirs." Young has also been known to play "Sweet Home Alabama" in concert occasionally. To demonstrate this camaraderie, Van Zant frequently wore a Neil Young Tonight's the Night T-shirt while performing "Sweet Home Alabama". Crazy Horse bassist Billy Talbot can often be seen reciprocating by wearing a Jack Daniel's-styled Lynyrd Skynyrd T-shirt (including at the Live Rust concert).

In his book Waging Heavy Peace: A Hippie Dream, Young stated that Lynyrd Skynyrd wrote "Sweet Home Alabama" not in response to "Southern Man", but rather to Young's song "Alabama". Young noted that Lynyrd Skynyrd's implied criticism was deserved because Young's lyrics on "Alabama" were condescending and accusatory.

Other versions
 Merry Clayton's version of the song appeared on her self-titled 1971 album. She later performed backing vocals on "Sweet Home Alabama", after some personal conflict.
 Sylvester and the Hot Band included a funk version of the song on their self-titled 1973 album.
 David Allan Coe covered the song on his 1985 album Unchained.
The Dave Clark Five's version was released in 1971 as a single. It also appeared on their Dave Clark & Friends album.
 Morse Portnoy George included this song in a medley with "The Needle and the Damage Done" and "Cinnamon Girl" on their album Cover 2 Cover''.

References

Neil Young songs
1970 songs
Songs against racism and xenophobia
Southern United States in fiction
Songs written by Neil Young
Song recordings produced by David Briggs (record producer)
Songs about the American South